Shriners is a neighborhood in southeastern Lexington, Kentucky, United States. It takes its name from the Shriners Hospital for Children located within it. Its boundaries are Richmond Road to the east, Chinoe Road to the north, Cooper Drive to the west, and Lakeview Drive to the south.

Neighborhood statistics

 Area: 
 Population: 1,835
 Population density: 4,062 people per square mile
 Median household income: $71,584

References

Neighborhoods in Lexington, Kentucky
Shriners